Several vessels have been named Gunjava:

, of 680 tons (bm), was launched at Rangoon in 1786 and broken up at Calcutta.
 was launched at Sulkea in 1826. She was wrecked in December 1827 at Madras.

ship names